Yelena Glikina (born 20 September 1969) is a Soviet fencer. She competed in the women's individual and team foil events at the 1988 and 1992 Summer Olympics.

References

External links
 

1969 births
Living people
Russian female foil fencers
Soviet female foil fencers
Olympic fencers of the Soviet Union
Olympic fencers of the Unified Team
Fencers at the 1988 Summer Olympics
Fencers at the 1992 Summer Olympics